Kayao is a town in the Kayao Department of Bazèga Province in central Burkina Faso. Kayao has a population of 2,018 and is the capital of Kayao Department.

References

External links
Satellite map at Maplandia.com

Populated places in the Centre-Sud Region
Bazèga Province